LyddAir is a British charter airline based at Lydd Airport, Kent, United Kingdom. It operates scheduled charter passenger services, air charter and air freight services, as well as an ACMI or fractional ownership programme. It is based at Lydd Airport.

History
The airline was established and soon started operations in June 1997. Jonathan Gordon (Managing Director of LyddAir) acquired Lydd Airport in June 1996 and a year later started Sky-Trek Airlines as a wholly owned subsidiary of his aviation consultancy, Atlantic Bridge Aviation. It was relaunched as LyddAir in April 2002. The airline is wholly owned by South East Airports and has seven employees (at March 2007).

In November 2018, it was announced the airline had ended scheduled flights and continue to focus on charter flights only.

Fleet
As of April 2022 the LyddAir fleet includes the following light aircraft:

Historical fleet 
 Beech Jet 400A

References

External links
Lydd Air official website

Charter airlines of the United Kingdom
Airlines established in 2001
British companies established in 2001
2001 establishments in England
Lydd
Companies based in Kent